Greg Dean may refer to:

 Greg Dean (cartoonist), creator of the webcomic Real Life
 Greg Dean (footballer) (born 1928), Australian rules footballer